Two's Company: The Duets is a 2006 album by Cliff Richard. It is a part-compilation and part-studio album of duets. The guests include Elton John, Barry Gibb, Dionne Warwick, Olivia Newton-John, Lulu, Brian May  and Hank Marvin.

In the UK, the album reached number 8 in the UK Albums Chart and was certified Gold. The album has sold over 320,000 copies worldwide. The album features a reworking of "Move It", with Brian May of Queen on guitar. When released as a double A-Side single with "21st Century Christmas", the song reached number 2 on the UK Singles Chart. A digital only single of "Yesterday Once More", a cover of Carpenters song, was recorded with Daniel O'Donnell and released earlier in November. The album also features a posthumous duet featuring vocals of Matt Monro.

Track listing

Charts and certifications

Weekly charts

Year-end charts

Certifications

References

Cliff Richard albums
2006 albums